Racine carrée Live (stylised as √ Live) is a live video release by Belgian musician Stromae. It was released on 11 December 2015.

Track listing

Charts

Certifications

References

External links
  

2015 live albums
Stromae albums
French-language live albums